Rokovnjači (The Bandits) is a novel by the Slovene author Josip Jurčič. It was first published in 1881.

See also
List of Slovenian novels

References

Slovenian novels
1881 novels